{{Infobox election
| previous_election = 1970 Mexican general election
| previous_year = 1970
| next_election = 1982 Mexican general election
| next_year = 1982
| election_date = 4 July 1976
| country = Mexico
| module = {{Infobox election
| embed = yes
| election_name = Presidential election
| type = presidential

| image1 = Jose Lopez Portillo.jpg
| nominee1 = José López Portillo
| party1 = Institutional Revolutionary Party
| popular_vote1 = 16,727,993| percentage1 = 100%'| title = President
| before_election = Luis Echeverría 
| before_party = Institutional Revolutionary Party 
| after_election = José López Portillo
| after_party = Institutional Revolutionary Party 
}}}}

General elections were held in Mexico on 4 July 1976. José López Portillo was the only candidate in the presidential election, and was elected unopposed. In the Chamber of Deputies election, the Institutional Revolutionary Party won 195 of the 237 seats, as well as winning all 64 seats in the Senate election. Voter turnout was 64.6% in the Senate election and 62.0% in the Chamber election.

Background
Before the electoral reform of 1977, only four political parties were allowed to participate in the elections: the ruling Institutional Revolutionary Party (PRI), the Popular Socialist Party (PPS), the Authentic Party of the Mexican Revolution (PARM) and the right-wing National Action Party (PAN), which was practically the only real opposition party at the time.

The campaign and the elections took place during a tense period: the economic crisis, the leftist guerrilla uprisings in some parts of the country and the Dirty War the government took against them, were some of many issues that outgoing President Luis Echeverría faced and which jeopardised the power of the ruling PRI.

Nomination of the PRI presidential candidate
Some of the PRI contenders for the party's 1976 presidential candidacy were:
 Mario Moya Palencia (Secretary of the Interior). He was initially perceived as the natural candidate to succeed President Luis Echeverría, given that Echeverría and his predecessor Gustavo Díaz Ordaz had been Secretaries of the Interior immediately prior to receiving the presidential nomination. Moya Palencia was also reported to have the support of the Army and most of the State Governors for his candidacy.

 Porfirio Muñoz Ledo (Secretary of Labor). He was noted for his large government experience at his relatively young age, having had a meteoric rise in the PRI ranks. He was reported to have the support of the Confederation of Mexican Workers in his bid for the presidency.

 Augusto Gómez Villanueva (Secretary of Agrarian Reform). Close to President Echeverría, his previous experience as President of the National Peasants' Confederation as well as his tenure as Secretary of Agrarian Reform solidified his leadership of the peasant sector, which supported his presidential bid.

José López Portillo (Secretary of Finance). He had little political experience - having previously been a law teacher and later working as a government bureaucrat-, but he had the particular advantage of being a childhood friend of President Echeverría, to whom he owed his government career, including his arrival at the Secretariat of Finance in 1973. López Portillo was not initially considered a serious contender for the PRI's presidential candidacy, as he didn't seem to have the support of any of the PRI's sectors for his bid, and he was relatively ignored by reporters and other politicians in comparison to the aforementioned contenders.

In October 1974, the Instituto Mexicano de Opinión Pública (IMOP) carried out, for the first time in Mexican politics, an opinion poll to reveal the public's perceptions of the contenders and their chances to obtain the PRI presidential candidacy in 1976 and succeed Echeverría. 2,730 people were asked to choose which contender, in their opinion, better fit the following criteria:

Muñoz Ledo would later recall that during this period, he received a visit from President Echeverría. During the meeting at Muñoz Ledo's house, Echeverría went to the garden and commented that it was "too small to receive delegations". Muñoz Ledo understood the phrase as meaning that he would be the chosen one to succeed him as President, interpreting Echeverría's comment as referring to the PRI delegations that would visit his house to congratulate him on his nomination, and so he decided to buy the land that was behind the garden so as to enlarge it. However, he would later discover that he had misinterpreted Echeverría's comment, and that he wasn't his chosen candidate.

In June 1975, Echeverría privately told López Portillo that he would be his successor, and on 5 October he was officially nominated by the PRI as its presidential candidate for the 1976 elections. The aforementioned Muñoz Ledo was then appointed both President of the PRI's National Executive Committee as well as General Coordinator of López Portillo's campaign, while López Portillo appointed Julio Rodolfo Moctezuma as director of the party's Instituto de Estudios Políticos, Económicos y Sociales'' (IEPES).

Echeverría would later state that he chose López Portillo to succeed him because, as President, "I was aware that the country's main problem was the financial one", which should be faced by his Secretary of Finance, "who had shared with me the attacks of a reactionary and obtuse private sector, which did not hesitate to place its funds abroad in their eagerness to break me down".

Campaign

The PPS and the PARM supported López Portillo's candidacy, as they had traditionally done with previous candidates for the PRI.

At the time, the opposition party PAN was going through internal conflicts and, for the first time upon its foundation, was unable to nominate a candidate for the 1976 presidential elections.

On the other hand, the Mexican Communist Party nominated Valentín Campa as their presidential candidate. At the time, however, this party had no official registry and was not allowed to participate in elections, so Campa's candidacy was not officially recognized and he didn't have access to the media. He had to run as a write-in candidate, as he would not appear in the ballots.

These factors led to López Portillo effectively running unopposed. His campaign echoed this "unanimous" support for him, and his slogan was "La solución somos todos" ("All of us are the solution"). López Portillo later joked that, due to running without opposition, it would have been enough for "his mother's vote for him" to win the election.

López Portillo had been separated from his wife Carmen Romano for some time, but upon being nominated by the PRI as its presidential candidate, the two of them were persuaded by PRI advisers to reunite and to maintain the appearance of a solid marriage, so as to not alienate the largely conservative, catholic populace.

Popular Cuban singer Celia Cruz recorded a jingle for the López Portillo campaign, titled "¿Dónde estás, José?" ("Where are you, José"?). Other entertainers such as Enrique Guzmán and María Elena Velasco performed on an LP issued by the López Portillo campaign.

Results

President

By state

Senate
Jorge Cruickshank García from the Popular Socialist Party was elected Senator for the state of Oaxaca. Although he ran in coalition with the PRI and therefore was not an opposition senator, he was the first Senator not to come from the PRI since 1929.

Chamber of Deputies

Aftermath
There were many rumours that outgoing president Luis Echeverría was planning to carry out a coup d'état against his own candidate, López Portillo, to perpetuate himself in power. A month after the elections, a diplomatic cable sent by then American ambassador in Mexico, Joseph J. Jova, to the U.S. Department of State echoed those rumours, and detailed a hypothetical scenario in which Echeverría would order the assassination of president-elect López Portillo after September 1, using the leftist guerrilla Liga Comunista 23 de Septiembre and the CIA as scapegoats. On August 13, the Liga tried to kidnap Margarita López Portillo, sister of the president elect; the attempt failed and the Liga's leader, David Jiménez Sarmiento, was killed by security forces during the incident.

In the end, López Portillo took office as scheduled on December 1 without further incidents.

Legitimacy in dispute
Although the results ensured the PRI remained in power, the lack of opposition to José López Portillo raised concerns about the lack of legitimacy of the Mexican political system. As a result, an electoral reform law was enacted in 1977, introducing partial proportional representation for the Congressional and Senate elections in order to ensure better representation of opposition parties – something extremely difficult under the first-past-the-post system that had been in force. However, the PRI retained its position as the dominant party, retaining the presidency until Vicente Fox of the National Action Party was elected in 2000.

These have been the last Mexican presidential elections in which a candidate has run unopposed.

References

Presidential elections in Mexico
Mexico
General
Legislative elections in Mexico
Single-candidate elections
July 1976 events in Mexico
Election and referendum articles with incomplete results